Rosina is a given name.

Notable people with this name 
 Rosina Acheampong, Ghanaian educationist
 Rosina Regina Ahles (1799–1854), German actress
 Rosina Amenebede (born 1985), Ghanaian athlete
 Rosina Anselmi (1880–1965), Italian actress
 Rosina Bierbaum (born 1952), American academic
 Rosina Cox Boardman (1878–1970), American painter
 Rosina Brandram (1845–1907), English opera singer and actress
 Rosina Buckman (1881–1948), New Zealand soprano
 Rosina Bulwer Lytton (1802–1882), English writer
 Rosina Cazali (born 1960), Guatemalan art critic
 Rosina Conde (born 1954), Mexican narrator, playwright and poet
 Rosina Dafter (1875–1959), Australian astronomer
 Rosina Davies (1863–1949),Welsh evangelist
 Rosina Edmunds (1900–1956), Australian architect
 Rosina Fernhoff (born 1931), American actress
 Rosina Ferrara (1861–1934), Italian artists' model
 Rosina Ferrario (1888–1959), Italian pilot
 Rosina Galli (dancer) (1892–1940), Italian-American ballet dancer
 Rosina Galli (actress) (1906–1969), Italian-American film actress
 Anna Rosina Gambold (1762–1821), American Moravian missionary and diarist
 Anna Rosina de Gasc (1713–1783), German portrait painter
 Maria Rosina Giberne (1802−1885), French-English artist
 Rosina von Graben von Rain (died 1534), Austrian noblewoman
 Sara Rosina Gramática (born 1942), Argentine architect
 Rosina Mantovani Gutti (1851–1943), Italian painter
 Rosina Harrison (1899–1989), lady-in-waiting to Lady Astor
 Rosina Heikel (1842–1929), Finnish medical doctor and feminist
 Rosina Henley (1890–1978), American actress and screenwriter
 Rosina ǁHoabes, Namibian politician
 Rosina Hodde (born 1983), Dutch hurdler
 Cornelia Rosina Jones (1907–1979), Dutch politician from Saba
 Rosina Komane, South African politician
 Rosina Lam (born 1987), Hong Kong actress
 Rosina Lawrence (1912–1997), Canadian-born American actress, singer, and dancer
 Rosina Lhévinne (1880–1976), Russian American pianist
 Rosina Lippi (born 1956), American writer
 Rosina McManus (died 2008), Irish camogie functionary
 Rosina Palmer (1844–1932), Australian opera singer
 Rosina Penco (1823–1894), Italian operatic soprano
 Rosina Raisbeck (1916–2006), Australian opera and concert mezzo-soprano singer
 Rosina Randafiarison (born 1999), Malagasy weightlifter
 Rosina Schneeberger (born 1994), Austrian skier
 Rosina Schnorr (1618–1679), German businessperson
 Althea Rosina Sherman (1853–1943), American illustrator and writer
 Rosina Emmet Sherwood (1854–1948), American painter
 Rosina Smith (1891–1985), British communist activist
 Rosina Storchio (1872–1945), Italian lyric soprano
 Rosina Thompson (born 1868), British trance medium
 Rosina Tucker (1881–1987), American labor organizer
 Rosina Umelo (born 1930), Nigerian writer
 Rosina Vokes (1854–1894), British actress and dancer
 Rosina Wachtmeister (born 1939), Austrian artist
 Rosina Widmann (1826–1908), German educator
 Rosina Zornlin (1795–1859), British author

Fictional characters 

 Rosina (The Barber of Seville), a figure from Rossini's opera The Barber of Seville
 Rosina, central character of "The Invisible Girl", 1833 story by Mary Shelley
 Rosiña, starring role in the 1941 Spanish comedy film Stowaway on Board
 Rosina, daughter of the protagonist in the 1957 Italian film Il Grido

See also 
 Rosina (surname)
 Rosina (disambiguation)
 Rosine (given name)
 

Feminine given names
Italian feminine given names
German feminine given names